The Mall at Green Hills is a shopping mall located in Nashville, Tennessee, United States. The mall has more than 100 stores and restaurants on two main floors totaling , including Louis Vuitton, Tiffany & Co., Burberry, Crate & Barrel, Apple Store and Restoration Hardware. The Center is anchored by Nordstrom, Dillard's, and Macy's.

History
The mall has undergone several renovations and expansions since its opening in 1955 as an open-air strip mall. The original layout contained 112,400 square feet (10,442 square meters) of retail space and included Woolworth and Walgreens. In the late 1960s, a Castner Knott store opened along with a newly-constructed enclosed area. Cain-Sloan (which became Dillard's in 1987) opened a stand-alone store at the west end of the mall.

In 1998, a new development emerged adjacent to the mall, a Regal Cinemas 16-screen megaplex. Regal also opened an indoor amusement park, "FunScape", which closed in 2000 when Regal pulled the plug on the concept. Castner Knott became Proffitt's, and later Hecht's.

A new Hecht's store was built in 2004. Hecht's became Macy's in 2006.

A brand new Nordstrom store, Tennessee's first, opened in 2011 next to Dillard's at the mall's entrance facing Abbott Martin Road.

Anchor Stores
 Nordstrom
 Dillard's
 Macy's

See also
List of shopping malls in Tennessee

References

External links
The Mall at Green Hills official website

Shopping malls in Tennessee
Economy of Nashville, Tennessee
Shopping malls established in 1955
Tourist attractions in Nashville, Tennessee
Buildings and structures in Nashville, Tennessee
1955 establishments in Tennessee
Taubman Centers